Tejay may refer to:

 Tejay, Kentucky
 Tejay Antone (born 1993), American baseball player
 Tejay van Garderen (born 1988), American cyclist
 Tejay Johnson (born c. 1989) American college football player

See also
 TJ (disambiguation)
 Tjay (disambiguation)